Azmi Mahafzah is the Jordanian Minister of Education and Minister of Higher Education and Scientific Research. He was appointed as minister on 27 October 2022.

Education 
Mahafzah holds a Doctor of Medicine (1977) from the University of Damascus and a Doctor of Philosophy in Microbiology and Immunology (1984) from the American University of Beirut.

References 

21st-century Jordanian politicians
Education ministers of Jordan
Higher education ministers of Jordan
Jordanian politicians
Year of birth missing (living people)
Living people